Portuguese art includes many different styles from many different eras.

Sculptures
Portuguese sculptures can be best analysed by studying the many tombs of the 12th and 13th Centuries that are found throughout Portugal. In the late 1700s, the colony of Brazil was the main influence in Portuguese sculpture. This can be seen by the increase in Baroque wooden sculpture during this time. Joaquim Machado de Castro, a famous Portuguese artist who lived around thjais responsible for a lot of these works.

Painting

The Classical and Romantic styles of painting, brought to Portugal from Italy and France, had an influence on Portuguese artist Machado de Castro in the late 18th century and António Soares dos Reis in the 19th century. A school for amateur painters, led by Nuno Gonçalves, was popular in the 15th century. As a result, Flemish artists added to the native style by decorating palaces and convents using their own techniques. The result gave Portugal a rich heritage of religious art. The Romantic Period in the 19th century sparked a rebirth of national art. This was followed by an era of naturalist realism, which in turn was followed by experimentation the 20th century.

Contemporary artists
Many Portuguese contemporary artists have made their mark on the world stage. Maria Helena Vieira de Silva was a famous Portuguese abstract painter and Carlos Botelho was known for his street scenes of Lisbon. Paula Rego is known for her "storytelling" in painting. She became famous for her works "Dog Woman" (1990's), and "Abortion", a reaction to the referendum in Portugal which made abortion a crime (late 1990s). Her art has been shown in museums such as Tate Modern in London and Casa das Histórias Paula Rego, in Cascais (dedicated solely to her art).

Azulejos
The Portuguese glazed tiles (azulejos) are one of Portugal's best decorative arts. Many 16th and 17th century buildings are lined with tiles, and the rooms and halls of palaces and mansions have tilted panels following a colour motif. Some prime examples of this style of art are the Pátio da Carranca (courtyard of Carranca) of the Paço de Sintra (Palace of Sintra), the São Roque church in Lisbon and the Quinta da Bacalhoa at Vila Fresca de Azeitão near Setúbal.

References